Maanhaarrand Pass, also known as Breedtsnek, is situated in the North West Province, in the Magaliesberg Nature Area (South Africa).  The pass is along an unnumbered secondary road between the towns of Magaliesburg and Marikana.

 Driving Skill level: Novice to Intermediate
 Road Condition: Gravel surface
 Remarks: Beautiful views

Mountain passes of North West (South African province)